Shikarpur is a town and a municipal board in Bulandshahr district in the Indian state of Uttar Pradesh.

History
Shikarpur was founded by Gaur Brahmins of Chaudhary title tracing back their settlement to the times of pandavas. Old name of Shikarpur was Govindpur kantain held by Gaur brahmins. During the ghori invasion of India Gaurs were ousted by Tagas who claim to be a non priest sub caste of Gaur Brahmins but Gaur Chaudharis subsequently recovered their estate only to be again ousted by Shaikh mansur a Muhammaden chief. Mansur invited the Gaur Chaudharis for feast told the Gaurs about his good intentions when the Chaudhary and his relatives settle for the feast Mansur killed all of them barbarously from behind with his soldier. Pandit Nanak Chand son of the murdered Chaudhary revenged his father and relatives death 
by slaying Shaikh and his army with the help of other Gaur brahmin zamindars of Bulandshahr and captured the land former had Usurped.

Demographics
The provisional data for the 2011 Census of India recorded Shikarpur as having a population of 33,130. Males constituted 52.77% of the population and females 47.22%. The average literacy rate of 65.37% was lower than the national average, with male literacy at 74.68% and female literacy at 55.68%. In Shikarpur, 17.5% of the population was then under six years of age.

References

 Cities and towns in Bulandshahr district